The 2023 K3 League is the third season of the K3 League as a semi-professional league and the third tier of South Korean football league system. The regular season is from 11 March to 11 November 2023. Changwon City FC is the defending champions.

Competition format 
This year, the competition features 16 teams, with each of them playing 30 matches at the end of the season. The 15th and 16th placed team are automatically relegated to K4 League, and the 1st and 2nd from K4 League, are automatically promoted to the 2024 season, replacing the K3-relegated teams. No championship play-offs will be held in the 2023 season.

Promotion and relegation 
Teams relegated from the 2022 K3 League
 Dangjin Citizen (via Relegation play-off)

Teams promoted to the 2023 K3 League
 Yangpyeong
 Chuncheon Citizen (via Promotion play-off)

Teams

Foreign players

League table

Results

Promotion–relegation play-off 
The match will be played on 13 November 2023. The 3rd and 4th placed team from the 2023 K4 League will play for a spot in the 2024 K3 League against the 14-th placed team in the 2023 K3 League.

See also 
 2023 K League 1
 2023 K League 2
 2023 K4 League

References 

K3 League seasons
2023 in South Korean football